Vieri Lasinio Di Castelvero Trophy is the sailing trophy awarded at the Junior Snipe World Championship. The Vieri Lasinio Di Castelvero Trophy is awarded to the winning skipper. The Snipe Class National Secretary shall be responsible for safekeeping of the trophy and its delivery with all fees paid, to the site of the next competition. The name of the winning skipper & crew names, year, fleet and country shall be engraved at the winner’s expense in uniform engraving.

The Junior Snipe World Championship is open to contestants under 22 years old (not having their 22nd birthday during the calendar year the regatta is held) and limited to 10 skippers from any country. In addition to the limit of 10 entries per country, the following skippers have automatic bids:
Current Junior World Champion
Junior European Champion
First Junior from Western Hemisphere & Orient Championship
One additional skipper from the host country, providing that it does not have among its other representatives the Junior World, Junior European or First Junior at WH&O Championship.

All skippers must be citizens, or bonafide residents for at least one year, of the country they represent.

The Junior Snipe World Championship is held every two years in odd numbered years in waters selected by the Board of Governors of the Snipe Class International Racing Association (SCIRA) under the following conditions:
Nine or eleven races, depending on local conditions, of the official SCIRA courses, lasting approximately 60-75 minutes.
If 6 to 8 races are completed, the worst race shall be dropped including a disqualification. If 5 or fewer races are completed, all shall be counted. Three races shall constitute a regatta.
There must be separate regatta and protest committees and a judge at each mark.
The same skipper must sail all races. He can be replaced after the first race only, and then only if he is obviously incapacitated. If a skipper is replaced in this manner, the first race shall be dropped. The same crew must sail in all races except for reasons satisfactory to the race committee.
Competitors may use their own boats. The Fleet organizing the event shall provide to juniors not bringing their own boats of good quality and competitiveness that shall be chartered for an amount not exceeding US$500.00, insurance inclusive. The boats provided shall be of hull #29000 or higher. A committee composed of the Commodore, National Secretary of the host country, a qualified SCIRA representative from the opposing hemisphere, and others to be designated by the Commodore shall be assigned to review and approve the boats. At least two extra boats will be provided at the regatta site to allow for beyond prompt repair of a breakdown and replacement.
The country holding the regatta is obliged to offer lodging and food to the first crew of each country, National Secretaries and SCIRA authorities, and if possible to the second crew.

Winners.

References

External links 
SCIRA

Snipe World Championships
Youth sailing